Tlaloc Rivas is a Mexican-American writer, producer, and theatre director. He is one of the co-founders of the Latinx Theatre Commons, which works side by side with HowlRound to revolutionize American theater and to highlight and promote the contributions and presence of Latinos in theatre. Central to Rivas' work is the Latino experience, but also exploring the American experience through the lens' of underrepresented voices.  Rivas focuses on writing and directing plays that significantly explore Latino identity and history. Additionally, Rivas has also translated and adapted plays from the Spanish language and directed Spanish-language and bilingual plays such as Mariela in the Desert by Karen Zacarias and classical works such as Peribáñez y el Comendador de Ocaña.

Early life and education
Tlaloc Rivas was born in Tijuana, Baja California, Mexico and is a Chicano/Mexican immigrant of Indigenous (Cora People/Nayarit), Afro-Venezuelan, and Spanish descent. He is named after the Aztec God of Rain and Fertility, Tlaloc. He spent his early childhood in Mexico and has noted that his family members were oral storytellers. The early exposure he had to storytelling helped Rivas shape and develop his own storytelling skills at a young age. His parents were both involved in the Chicano Movement from the late 1960s into the 1970s while living in San Diego, and Rivas' honorary godfather at his baptism was civil rights leader Rodolfo Gonzales.

Rivas' family later moved from Escondido, California to Watsonville, California where he attended Watsonville High School. Spurred and marked by the events of the Watsonville Canning Strike, the Gomez v City of Watsonville Supreme Court voting rights decision, and the 1989 Loma Prieta earthquake, he deferred college for several years to remain involved as a community organizer and voting rights activist. He later enrolled at Cabrillo College, where theatre classes prompted him to get involved with theatre in general. In 1993, after having interned with El Teatro Campesino for nearly two seasons, Rivas along with three other classmates (Manuel Montez, Leonard Maestas and Renee Sola) founded Chicano TheatreWorks, a company created in response to the passage of California Proposition 187.

In the Fall of 1993, Rivas transferred to The University of California, Santa Cruz. He graduated with honors from UC Santa Cruz within a two-year period, obtaining a B.A. in Theater Arts. During his time at UC Santa Cruz, Rivas focused on acting and stage management, but transitioned into directing with a production of The Colored Museum by George C. Wolfe, which toured to South Central Los Angeles communities in the wake of the 1992 Los Angeles riots with support from Stevenson College. His senior thesis production of The Shrunken Head of Pancho Villa by acclaimed playwright Luis Valdez was honored with a Dean of the Arts award, Chancellor's Honors, and the Regents Presidential Award for Excellence in Undergraduate Research.

In 1996, Rivas departed Chicano TheatreWorks after being only one of two directors nationwide accepted into the School of Drama at the University of Washington. As a student in the Professional Directors Training Program, he studied under M. Burke Walker (founder of the acclaimed Empty Space Theatre in Seattle, Washington) and Valerie Curtis-Newton. He directed productions such as José Rivera's The House of Ramon Iglesia, The House of Bernarda Alba by Federico García Lorca and Octavio Solis' El Paso Blue. During his final year of graduate studies, he completed a Directing Fellowship with the Oregon Shakespeare Festival, serving as assistant director on their productions of Othello, The Good Person of Szechwan, and Rosmersholm. Rivas graduated with a Master of Fine Arts degree in Directing from UW in 1999.

Career
Tlaloc Rivas started writing and directing plays in California and has since then done the same in other states including New York, Illinois, Pennsylvania, Georgia, New Mexico, Washington, and Iowa. While still an undergraduate student, Rivas served as Artistic Director of Chicano TheatreWorks, a company which he also helped establish. Then, while he was in graduate school, he further dived into his professional career as a director with a position as Artistic Associate for The Group Theatre in Seattle. Upon obtaining his MFA in Directing, Rivas was appointed Artistic Director for Venture Theater Company.

In the early 2000s, Rivas was selected for the Career Development Program for Directors, administered by Theatre Communications Group and the National Endowment of the Arts. Rivas continued working by adjuncting or guest directing at Bryn Mawr College, Arcadia University and University of the Arts. Through this program, he assisted and observed many esteemed stage directors, including Oskar Eustis on Homebody/Kabul, Emily Mann on Anna in the Tropics, Joseph Chaikin on Shut-Eye, and Lisa Peterson on Chavez Ravine by Culture Clash.

In 2004, he moved to New York City and continued his freelance career as a director. In 2009, Rivas directed an acclaimed production of The Caucasian Chalk Circle by Bertolt Brecht at Queens College and the following year he took the position of Assistant Professor of Theatre at The University of Missouri- St. Louis. From 2012 to 2018, he taught at The University of Iowa as Assistant Professor of Directing while also teaching within the university's Latino Studies program. In the Summer of 2018, he was honored with a Presidential Post-Doctoral Fellowship at Carnegie Mellon College of Fine Arts, School of Drama.

Rivas maintains a high professional directing profile with regional productions across the United States. Rivas has directed at companies such as Aurora Theatre Company, Cleveland Public Theatre, Halcyon Theatre, Shakespeare Festival of St. Louis, New Harmony Project, Salt Lake Acting Company, Los Angeles Theatre Center, Quantum Theatre and Merrimack Repertory Theatre, among others.

In 2015, Rivas directed his most recognized original written piece: Johanna: Facing Forward. Also during 2015, Johanna: Facing Forward brought him to win second place in the MetLife Nuestras Voces Playwriting Competition. In addition to this recognition, Rivas has also been a recipient of the Sir John Gielgud Fellowship in Classical Directing and honored by a Most Ambitious Production award from the St. Louis Post-Dispatch for The New World.

Written works

Johanna: Facing Forward 
Tlaloc Rivas' original work Johanna: Facing Forward is based on actual events. In 2007, Joanna Orozco was shot in the face by her ex-boyfriend. Johanna, who was only 18 years old at the time, went through intense recovery and post-recovery she went on to advocate for the rights of victims of domestic violence. To write his play, Rivas focused on the special series that Rachel Dissell wrote about Joanna Orozco for The Plain Dealer.

In its entirety, Johanna: Facing Forward is a bilingual play that primarily grapples with abusive relationships, assault and trauma, and survivor empowerment.

Other plays 

Additional works can be found on the New Play Exchange website.

Awards and honors 
Rivas has been the recipient of the following:

 Runner-Up in MetLife Nuestras Voces Playwriting Competition for Johanna: Facing Forward, 2015
 Sir John Gielgud Fellowship in Classical Directing from the Stage Directors & Choreographers Foundation, 2014-2015
 Most Ambitious Production, The New World - St. Louis Post-Dispatch Judy Awards, 2012
 Person of the Year in NYTheatre.com for directing Summer and Smoke and Five Kinds of Silence, 2008
 NEA/TCG Career Development Program for Directors, 2001-2003

Affiliations
Rivas has been affiliated with the following:

 Co-Founder of the Latinx Theatre Commons
 Presidential Post-Doctoral Fellow at Carnegie Mellon University School of Drama
 Usual Suspect of New York Theatre Workshop
 Member of Dramatists Guild
 Member of Literary Managers and Dramaturgs of the Americas
 Associate Member of Stage Directors and Choreographers
 Member of The National Association of Latino Arts and Cultures
 Writer for HowlRound, A Journal for the Theater Commons

Productions supervised

Professional productions supervised
Rivas has supervised the following professional work:

Academic work supervised
Rivas had supervised the following studies:

References 

University of Iowa faculty
American theatre directors
American academics of Mexican descent
American writers of Mexican descent
Bryn Mawr College faculty
Arcadia University faculty
Queens College, City University of New York faculty
University of Missouri–St. Louis faculty
Latin Americanists
People from Tijuana
People from Watsonville, California
Chicano
American humanities academics
University of California, Santa Cruz alumni
University of Washington School of Drama alumni
Living people
Year of birth missing (living people)